Bob Rockwell (born May 1945 in Miami, Oklahoma) is a jazz saxophonist. He was born in the U.S. but emigrated to Denmark in 1983.

Biography
Rockwell was raised in Minneapolis, and in his early career he toured the U.S. in rock and rhythm and blues bands. He worked in Las Vegas in the late 1960s and early 1970s, then moved to New York City, where he played with The Thad Jones/Mel Lewis Orchestra, Tito Puente, Ben Sidran, Freddie Hubbard, Ray Drummond, Billy Hart, Rufus Reid, Victor Lewis, Ron McClure, Tom Harrell, Chuck Israels, John Hicks, Al Foster, Anthony Cox, Bill Dobbins, Keith Copeland, Clint Houston, and Richie Beirach. After settling in Copenhagen, Rockwell recorded for SteepleChase Records. He has worked in Europe with Ernie Wilkins, Kenny Drew, Alex Riel, Marilyn Mazur, Kenny Wheeler, Jan Kaspersen, and Jesper Lundgaard.

Awards and honors
 2003 Ben Webster Prize

Discography
 Androids (Celebration, 1974)
 Jungleopolis (with Art Resnick, 1974)
 No Rush (SteepleChase, 1985)
 On the Natch (SteepleChase, 1985)
 The Bob Rockwell Trio (SteepleChase, 1989)
 Reconstruction (SteepleChase, 1990)
 Born to Be Blue (SteepleChase, 1993 [1994])
 Light Blue (SteepleChase, 1995)
 Shades of Blue (SteepleChase, 1996)
 After Hours (Go Jazz, 1999)
 It's All Right With Me (Pony Canyon, 2001)
 Love Eyes (Pony Canyon, 2001)
 Bob's Wilder: Music of Alec Wilder (Stunt, 2003)
 Bob's Ben: A Salute to Ben Webster (Stunt, 2005)

References

1945 births
Living people
American expatriates in Denmark
American jazz saxophonists
American male saxophonists
American jazz musicians
Musicians from Oklahoma
SteepleChase Records artists
21st-century American saxophonists
Jazz musicians from Oklahoma
21st-century American male musicians
American male jazz musicians